Neomenia is a genus of solenogaster, and the only genus in its family.

Neomeniamorpha